Cyrtostylis huegelii, commonly known as the western common gnat orchid or midge orchid, is a species of orchid endemic to Western Australia. It usually has a single rounded leaf and a flowering spike with up to fifteen pale green and dull red flowers with a purplish, shelf-like labellum. Some authorities regard C. huegelii as a synonym of Cyrtostylis reniformis var. huegelii.

Description
The petals are similar in size and shape to the lateral sepals and curve downwards. Flowering occurs from July to September.

Taxonomy and naming
Cyrtostylis huegelii was first formally described in 1846 by Stephan Endlicher from a specimen collected on Rottnest Island. The description was published in J.G.C. Lehmann's Plantae Preissianae. The specific epithet (huegelii) honours Charles von Hügel who collected the type specimen.

Some authorities regard C. huegelii as a synonym of C. reniformis var. huegelii.

Distribution and habitat
The western gnat orchid grows in shrubland, woodland and forest in wetter parts of the state and on granite outcrops in more inland areas. It is found from Kalbarri to Esperance.

References 

huegelii
Endemic orchids of Australia
Orchids of Western Australia
Plants described in 1846